The 1922–23 Paterson F.C. season was the first season for the club in the American Soccer League. Prior to the season, Adolph Buslik, a wealthy fur merchant, purchased the club as well as the former Falco F.C. franchise in the American Soccer League. The club finished the season in 5th place.

After the season, Buslik moved the franchise to New York and renamed it the National Giants Soccer Club.

American Soccer League

Pld = Matches played; W = Matches won; D = Matches drawn; L = Matches lost; GF = Goals for; GA = Goals against; Pts = Points

National Challenge Cup

Notes and references
Bibliography

Footnotes

Paterson F.C.
American Soccer League (1921–1933) seasons
Paterson F.C.